Kamata Station is a railway station in Ōta, Tokyo, Japan, operated by the East Japan Railway Company (JR East),and the private railway operator Tokyu Corporation.

Lines
Kamata Station is served by the following lines:

 Keihin-Tohoku Line (JR East)
 Tokyu Tamagawa Line
 Tokyu Ikegami Line

Keikyu Kamata Station on the Keikyu Main Line is located about 700 m to the east of Kamata Station.

Station layout

JR East
The JR East station is a surface station with platforms in a north-south direction.

Platforms

Tokyu

The Tokyu station is located to the southwest corner of the JR station.

Platforms

History
The JR East station opened on 11 April 1904. The Tokyu station opened on 6 October 1922 on the Ikegami Line, and services on Tamagawa Line began on 1 November 1923.

Future plans
Plans exist to build a Kama-Kama Line that would extend the Tokyu Tamagawa Line from Kamata eastward by approximately 800 m to Keikyu Kamata Station on the Keikyu Main Line and Keikyu Airport Line. This would provide an interchange between the lines, improving accessibility to Tokyo's Haneda Airport ahead of the 2020 Summer Olympics. , Ōta Ward has agreed with the Tokyo Metropolitan Government to pay 70% of the project cost of  while having the city government responsible for the remaining 30%.

Passenger statistics
In fiscal 2013, the JR East station was used by an average of 139,728 passengers daily (boarding passengers only), making it the nineteenth-busiest station operated by JR East. Over the same fiscal year the Tōkyū Ikegami and Tamagawa Line stations were used by an average of 69,464 and 88,102 passengers daily respectively (entering and exiting passengers).

The passenger figures for previous years are as shown below.

 Note that JR East figures are for boarding passengers only.

Surrounding area

 Keikyu Kamata Station (Keikyu Main Line)
 Kamata Mosque

See also
 List of railway stations in Japan

References

External links 

 Kamata Station (JR East) 
 Kamata Station (Tokyu) 

Railway stations in Japan opened in 1904
Tokyu Tamagawa Line
Tokyu Ikegami Line
Tōkaidō Main Line
Stations of Tokyu Corporation
Railway stations in Tokyo
Keihin-Tōhoku Line
Ōta, Tokyo